SASBO – The Finance Union (formerly the South African Society of Bank Officials) is a trade union in South Africa. It was founded in 1916 and has a membership of 70,000.

History
The union was founded in February 1916, in response to low staff numbers and high costs of living during World War I.  In its early years, it represented workers throughout the British colonies of southern Africa.  Its first secretary was Archie Crawford, who was also secretary of the South African Industrial Federation.  In 1920, it held a one-day strike for higher pay, which was successful; it claimed this was the first strike of bank clerks anywhere in the British Empire.  By 1926, it had 3,800 members, and was affiliated to the South African Trades Union Congress.

The union was long affiliated to the Trade Union Council of South Africa, and by 1980 it had 21,044 members, all of whom were white.  In 1981, it absorbed the National Union of Bank Employees of South Africa, representing "coloured" workers, and the South African Bank Employees' Union, representing black workers.  Later in the 1980s, it switched to the Federation of South African Labour Unions.  In 1994, it absorbed the Finance Industry Workers' Union.  Since 1995, SASBO has been affiliated with the Congress of South African Trade Unions; when it first joined, it was its only affiliate with a majority white membership.

Leadership

General Secretaries
1916: Archie Crawford
1923: F. R. Swan
1943: Richard Haldane
1964: Tom Alexander
1983: André Malherbe
Ben Smith
1994: Graeme Rowan
1999: Shaun Oelschig
2013:
2016: Joe Kokela

Presidents
Andre Malherbe
Peter McQueen
1990s: Keith Alberts
2000: Joe Kokela
2016: Moses Lekota

References

External links
 SASBO official site.

Congress of South African Trade Unions
Finance sector trade unions
Trade unions based in Johannesburg
Trade unions established in 1916
Trade unions in South Africa